Agnaldo Pinto de Moraes Júnior, commonly known as Moraes Jr. or Agnaldo Moraes (born 11 March 1994), is a Brazilian footballer who plays as a midfielder for Albanian club KS Kastrioti.

Career

Early career
Moraes started his career with Desportivo Brasil who played in Campeonato Paulista Série B, the fourth level of the São Paulo state professional football championship.
In 2011 Agnaldo spent time visiting and training with Manchester United. Moraes also played in a couple of friendlies for a Manchester United XI against Forest Green Rovers in June 2013, scoring 1 of the 2 goals in the 2–2 draw, and against Peterborough United in August 2012, again scoring one of the goals.

Molde FK
In March 2013 Moraes signed on a season-long loan for Norwegian Premier League side Molde.

Moraes' first appearance for Molde was in the Norwegian Cup first round match against Elnesvågen in which he also scored his first goal for the club. His first league appearance for Molde was against Hønefoss on 25 May 2013, in which he came on as a 59th minute Substitute for Josh Gatt. Moraes scored his first league goal for Molde in the 91st minute of their 3–3 draw away to Vålerenga on 22 June 2013.

RoPS (loan)
On 30 January 2018, RoPS announced the signing of Moraes on a season-long loan deal.

Career statistics

Club

Honours
Molde FK
Tippeligaen (1): 2014
NM Cupen (2): 2013, 2014

References

External links

Molde Profile

1994 births
Living people
Brazilian footballers
Desportivo Brasil players
Vila Nova Futebol Clube players
Molde FK players
Rovaniemen Palloseura players
Eliteserien players
Campeonato Brasileiro Série B players
Veikkausliiga players
Brazilian expatriate footballers
Expatriate footballers in Norway
Brazilian expatriate sportspeople in Norway
Expatriate footballers in Finland
Brazilian expatriate sportspeople in Finland
Association football midfielders